Manila in the Claws of Light  is a 1975 Filipino drama film directed by Lino Brocka based on the story In the Claws of Brightness by Edgardo M. Reyes. It is considered by many as one of the greatest films in Filipino cinema. It tells the story of Júlio Madiaga, a young man from the province of Marinduque who arrives in Manila for a mission to find his lover Ligaya. While making plans for his mission, he has to survive the conditions in the capital city, contending with issues like crime and prostitution.

It stars Hilda Koronel, Lou Salvador, Jr., Tommy Abuel, and in his film debut, Rafael Roco, Jr. The cinematography of the film was handled by Miguel de Leon and the editing was handled by brothers Edgardo and Ike Jarlego.

Plot 
Julio Madiaga is a young man from the island of Marinduque who arrives in Manila in 1970. From time to time, Julio passes by the corner of Ongpin and Misericordia, as he stares at a peculiar building from a distance. While pursuing his quest, he has to work to survive urban life. At first, Julio lands a job as a construction worker. In the site, he befriends Atong, a fellow worker who was hired some five weeks before. Another co-worker advises Julio that city life is quite difficult unless one has the income to enjoy urban comforts. Julio begins to slowly observe the harsh reality of society, culminating to the accidental death of a worker.

One day, while Julio and Atong shop for clothes in the marketplace, a woman dressed in black and wearing sunglasses catches Julio's attention. She reminds him of Mrs. Cruz, the woman who brought his girlfriend, Ligaya, to Manila for schooling. Julio immediately runs through the crowd to follow the woman and locates her. He tries to approach her, but before he can even say anything, the lady shrieks in distress. Julio flees to prevent making a scene, running back to Atong and leaving the marketplace with him. This is followed by other encounters with Mrs. Cruz, leading him to discover that Ligaya was brought to Manila for prostitution. Ligaya explains everything to Julio upon their reunion. Julio plans with Ligaya their return to Marinduque with her four-month old baby. They agree to meet at Arranque, but she fails to appear at the appointed time.

Julio returns to the house of a friend, Pol, who informs him the next day that Ligaya died that night. She allegedly fell down a flight of stairs, but her bruising suggests she was killed by Ah-Tek, the man who rented her from Mrs. Cruz and kept her and their baby imprisoned. Enraged, Julio stalks Ah-Tek, whom he saw at Ligaya's funeral, and locates his target. The following night, Julio goes to Ah-Tek's house and kills him to avenge the death of Ligaya. Afterwards, a mob pursues, corners, and strikes the fearful Julio. A heavenly silhouette of Ligaya is shown as the film fades to white, then sky blue.

Characters 
 Rafael Roco, Jr. as Julio Madiaga - The 21-year-old protagonist who hails from Marinduque, wandering Manila in search of his lover, Ligaya. He starts the narrative as a patient, if naive, character; only to gradually transform into a weary and vengeful person.
 Hilda Koronel as Ligaya Paraiso - The betrothed of Julio. She was brought away to Manila with the thought of getting proper education, only to wind up getting entrapped in sexual slavery. Her name literally translates to "joyful paradise".
 Lou Salvador, Jr. as Atong - A construction worker Julio befriends. Atong serves as Julio's guide to the plight of the working class; and in effect Manila, helping him cope with the unpleasantness of the city . He later gets wrongfully arrested and meets his demise at the hands of fellow inmates.
 Tommy Abuel as Pol - A friend of Julio who also acts as his confidant. He serves as Julio's guide to the impoverished districts of Manila. Steadfast and loyal, Pol also offers his help and gives advice to Julio whenever needed.
 Jojo Abella as Bobby - A call boy Julio befriends. He serves as Julio's guide to the world of male prostitution. An attraction towards Julio is implied.
 Pio de Castro as Imo - A colleague of Julio from the construction site. He was initially poor at the start of the narrative, but has later improved his lifestyle.
 Joonee Gamboa as Omeng - Another colleague of Julio from the construction site.
 Pancho Pelagio as Mr. Balajadia - One of the antagonists of the story. He is the foreman of the construction site Julio worked in. Arrogant and selfish, he often treated his subordinates unfairly.
 Juling Bagabaldo as Mrs. Cruz - One of the antagonists of the story. An unsavory character who recruits unsuspecting, young provincial women to her prostitution ring. It was speculated by Julio that "Mrs. Cruz" may not even be her real name, but rather an alias.
 Tommy Yap as Ah-Tek - One of the antagonists of the story. He is an unscrupulous mestizo de sangley who bought Ligaya from Mrs. Cruz's prostitution ring and made her his kept woman.

Production 
The film is based on a story, Sa mga Kuko ng Liwanag (lit. "In the Claws of Brightness'"), written by Edgardo Reyes. It was originally serialized in Liwayway magazine from 1966 to 1967, and was later published into a novel.

The adaptation in to film originally started out life as a writing exercise. In 1970, Ateneo de Manila graduate Clodualdo del Mundo, Jr. re-enrolled in his alma mater to take a short course in film writing. There, he wrote Pepot Artista (a screenplay he would later revisit in the 2000s). Del Mundo finished his script for Pepot Artista, which was supposed to be a major assignment, by the middle of the semester; earlier than what was expected. His professor, Nestor Torre, requested him to make another screenplay as way of filling in the extra time. Because he had just written an original screenplay, Del Mundo tried his hand at adapting a literary source for a change. He chose Reyes' story, already a novel by then, as the subject for his next assignment. After turning in the spec script, Del Mundo completed his course and relocated to the United States to continue his studies at the University of Kansas in Lawrence, Kansas.

Mike de Leon, grandson to Narcisa de Leon of LVN Pictures, has directed one short film and intended to expand his role in the film industry, namely as a producer. De Leon had just put up a new production company, Cinema Artists, and was in the process of seeking out projects. Eventually, De Leon remembered of Del Mundo's trial adaptation. Having been friends since their days at Ateneo de Manila, De Leon contacted Del Mundo with the idea of producing the latter's spec script. Del Mundo, who just returned from his four-year course in Kansas, gave De Leon his blessing and agreed to further polish the screenplay. "It was the right time," Del Mundo recalls.

Lino Brocka, who had just received acclaim for his previous work, Tinimbang Ka Ngunit Kulang, was approached by De Leon to direct the adaptation. Brocka took this as an opportunity to create a scathing commentary about the urban poverty amidst the Marcos dictatorship, and never hesitated to include his trademark homosexual theme in to the story. Brocka (a homosexual man himself) requested Del Mundo to rework on a few scenes to accommodate such approaches, which were never present in the original source. Other significant revisions were made, such as condensing the structure and adding more dramatic weight to the narrative. “Brocka understood the popular audience well," Del Mundo says. "He suggested additions to the screenplay [of The Claws of Light] to make it more commercial. It was fun working with him, although he was quite emotional.”

The production title was eventually changed from Sa mga Kuko ng Liwanag to Maynila, sa mga Kuko ng Liwanag (lit. translation: Manila in the Claws of Light) to emphasize on the setting of the story.

An independent production, The Claws of Light was produced with a modest budget. Principal photography occurred in 1974. The film was shot on actual locations around the vicinity of Manila, to better capture the authenticity of the city.

Jay Ilagan, who had previously acted in Brocka's films, initially played the lead role of Julio Madiaga. Having already participated in several days of shooting, Ilagan was asked to drop out of the production when Brocka became dissatisfied with the performance. Upon viewing the dailies, Brocka was convinced that Ilagan, who had a very healthy appearance, did not meet his vision of Julio—a pitiful vagrant that wades in and around the urban gutters. The role was re-cast with newcomer Bembol Roco in the part. Prior to this film, Roco's only foray in to acting was a relatively small role in Brocka's previous film, Three, Two, One. For this film, he was credited under his real name of Rafael Roco, Jr. The Claws of Light marked what would become the first lead role for Roco.

To play the love of Julio's life, Brocka did not have to look too far. The role of Ligaya Paraiso was a natural choice for his protégé, Hilda Koronel. Lou Salvador, Jr., a former matinee idol famous for playing angst-ridden romantic leads in LVN's teen rebel pictures, was cast against type as the wise and sympathetic Atong. Character actor Tommy Yap nabbed the role of the rarely-seen antagonist, Ah-Tek. Yap would later appear—albeit less significantly—in Brocka's Insiang, alongside Koronel. Majority of the actors that round out the film, such as Tommy Abuel and Joonee Gamboa, were veterans of both the stage and radio.

Symbolism 

Many who have seen The Claws of Light have speculated on the symbolism of the characters, which is hinted at in their names. For example, some comment that Ligaya Paraiso represents Inang Bayan, the Filipino concept of the motherland. Her name, which literally reads "joy[ful] paradise", is a reference to how Julio viewed his lover as an ideal paradise, and her given name is a nod to her newfound yet unwelcome occupation as a "lady of pleasure".

Julio Madiaga himself is regarded as a symbol of the provincial Filipino everyman, eking out a living in the hard conditions of the city. His surname is an archaic variant of matiyagâ ("patience”), a trait obvious in his hope-filled and persistent search for Ligaya.

The city itself is sometimes considered to be the main character instead of Julio and the others, while the film is also construed as a portrait of one man's corruption and eventual downfall.

Reception 
Rotten Tomatoes, a review aggregator, reports that 100% of five surveyed critics gave the film a positive review; the average rating is 8.4/10.  Manohla Dargis of The New York Times made it a "NYT Critics' Pick" and wrote, "The movie's palpable, deeply lived-in realism is among its great attractions, largely because the film isn’t just a story about a young Filipino Everyman, but because it’s also a de facto record of Manila in the 1970s."  Inkoo Kang of The Village Voice wrote, "The intimate proletarian melodrama The Claws of Light succeeds where so many political allegories fail: With ethical and emotional sophistication, it dramatizes the suffering of the disadvantaged with characters that feel individual yet archetypal." Meanwhile, Jose Capino, writing for The Criterion Collection, noted that the film was met with "charges of anti-Chinese racism from reviewers." Keith Uhlich of Time Out New York rated it 4/5 stars and wrote that it is "widely (and understandably) considered one of the pinnacles of Filipino cinema".  Alan Jones of Slant Magazine rated it 4.5/5 stars and called the film a precursor to A Touch of Sin.

Awards and recognition 
The film won Best Picture, Best Director, Best Screenplay, Best Cinematography, Best Actor, and Best Supporting Actor at the 1976 FAMAS awards.

The Claws of Light is one of the few Filipino films that has been consistently placed among the world's top 100 films of all time. It is the only film from the Philippines that entered in the list of the book, 1001 Movies You Must See Before You Die.

It was shown as part of the Cannes Classics section of the 2013 Cannes Film Festival.

Stage version 
A stage adaption of the film was released in 2017, directed by Joel Lamangan. It was presented by Grand Leisure Corporation and features music by Von de Guzman, choreography by Douglas Nierras, and production design by Jun Flavier Pablo.

The musical stars Arman Ferrer as Julio Madiaga; Shiela Valderrama-Martinez as Ligaya Paraiso (with Lara Maigue as alternate); Floyd Tena as Pol; Noel Rayos as Atong; Aicelle Santons as Perla (with Rita Daniela as alternate); Dulce as Mrs. Cruz (with Ima Castro as alternate).

Restoration 
Manila in the Claws of Light was restored in 4K resolution in 2013. The restoration was performed by World Cinema Foundation and the Film Development Council of the Philippines at Cineteca di Bologna/ L’Immagine Ritrovata laboratory, in association with LVN, Cinema Artists Philippines and Mike de Leon. The restored film premiered at the 2013 Cannes Film Festival as part of the Cinema Classics section and was released in the Philippines on August 7, 2013. The restored film was released on DVD and Blu-Ray as part of The Criterion Collection on June 12, 2018. Manila is the first and currently the only Southeast Asian film to receive a sole Criterion release.

See also 
 Insiang
Cinema of the Philippines

References

External links 
 
 
 
Manila in the Claws of Light: A Proletarian Inferno an essay by José B. Capino at the Criterion Collection

1975 films
1975 drama films
Philippine drama films
Tagalog-language films
Films based on short fiction
Films directed by Lino Brocka
Films based on Philippine novels
Films set in Manila